Mohammed Abdullah Ali Ba Rowis (born 30 November 1985) is a Yemeni international footballer who plays for Al-Wehda Adan as a right midfielder and right back.

Career
Ba Rowis has played club football for Al-Wehda and Umm Salal.

He made his international debut for Yemen in 2012, and was a squad member at the 2019 AFC Asian Cup.

References

1985 births
Living people
Yemeni footballers
Yemen international footballers
Yemeni expatriate footballers
Yemeni expatriate sportspeople in Qatar
Expatriate footballers in Qatar
Al-Wehda SC (Aden) players
Umm Salal SC players
Association football midfielders
2019 AFC Asian Cup players
Yemeni League players
Qatar Stars League players